is a 52-episode anime television series, created by Ryosuke Takahashi and Sunrise, featuring mechanical designs by Kunio Okawara. The series originally aired in Japan from April 1, 1983 to March 23, 1984 on TV Tokyo.

Armored Trooper Votoms

Armor Hunter Mellowlink

References

Armored Trooper Votoms